The 2016 FIBA World Olympic Qualifying Tournament in Manila was one of three 2016 FIBA World Olympic Qualifying Tournaments for Men. The tournament was held at the Mall of Asia Arena in Pasay, Philippines, from 5 to 10 July 2016. The winner qualified for the 2016 Summer Olympics.

Teams

Venue
The Mall of Asia Arena was chosen as the main venue for the tournament. Since the arena's location, Pasay, is part of Metro Manila, the host city of the Philippine qualifiers is designated as "Manila" for marketing purposes. The Arena hosted the 2013 FIBA Asia Championship.

Referees
The following referees were selected for the tournament.

 Sofiane Si Youcef
 Michael Aylen
 Elias Koromilas
 Luigi Lamonica
 Ferdinand Pascual
 José Carrion
 Saša Pukl
 Miguel Pérez

Preliminary round
All times are local (UTC+8).

Group A

Group B

Knockout phase

Semifinals

Final

Final rankings

Statistical leaders

Players

Points

Rebounds

Assists

Steals

Blocks

Other statistical leaders

Teams

Points

Rebounds

Assists

Steals

Blocks

Other statistical leaders

Issues

Reception to the Haka
There was mixed reception of the fans' reaction to the New Zealand squad while performing their Haka in which fans reacted with boos. However, the New Zealand team stated that there was no issue with it as "Different people react in different ways to it."

Marketing

Broadcasting
Below are the broadcasters of the participating teams

Side Events

The March to MOA
On the afternoon of July 5, day 1 of the tournament, a colorful street parade called The March to MOA (Mall of Asia Arena) was held to kick off the OQT Manila event festivities. It was a giant street party as the parade winds its way through the precinct streets of the SM Mall of Asia towards the Mall of Asia Arena. The parade was highlighted Filipino culture and feature attractive floats representing the six participating nations and FIBA as well as showcasing cultural dance and drummer groups from all over the Philippines.

The Global Village
A Global Village fan zone was erected beside the Mall of Asia Arena where fans were able to check various booths representing each of the participating countries including food, Music and Culture.

The Village Central was consisted of the registration area, passport for the village, get money or chits to buy food from the village, and avail of merchandise souvenirs from all the six participating countries.

See also
2016 FIBA World Olympic Qualifying Tournaments for Men
2016 FIBA World Olympic Qualifying Tournament – Belgrade
2016 FIBA World Olympic Qualifying Tournament – Turin

Notes

References

External links
Official website

FIBA Men, Manila
2016 in Philippine sport
FIBA Olympics men's qualifying
International basketball competitions hosted by the Philippines